Lieutenant General Manvel Sektori Grigoryan (Armenian: Մանվել Սեկտորի Գրիգորյան; 14 July 1956 – 19 November 2020) was an Armenian military leader and a member of the National Assembly of Armenia. At one point he was one of the highest-ranking officials in the Armenian Army, serving as Deputy Minister of Defense from 2000 to 2008. He served as the president of the Yerkrapah Volunteer Union from 1999 to 2018.

Early life and First Karabakh War 
Manvel Grigoryan was born on 14 July 1956 in the village of Arshaluys in Armavir province. He served in the Soviet Army from 1975 to 1977. He graduated from Stepanakert State University in 1993 and Yerevan State University in 1998. During the First Nagorno-Karabakh War, he commanded Armenian forces in the defense of Hadrut, the retaking of the region of Martakert, and the capture of Fuzuli. He commanded the Ejmiatsin Volunteer Battalion from 1992 to 1993. In 1993 he was appointed commander of the 83rd Motorized Rifle Brigade. Between 1996 and 2000 he was appointed commander of the 1st Army Corps of the Ministry of Defense and gained the rank of major general. In 1999, he became the president of the Yerkrapah Volunteer Union. In 2000, Grigoryan was appointed deputy defense minister and received the rank of lieutenant general. 

On 18 June 2018, the Ministry of Foreign Affairs of Azerbaijan accused Manvel of participating in Khojaly Massacre and committing other war crimes. According to a report by the Hetq investigative online newspaper made in 2014, Grigoryan owned significant properties and businesses, particularly in his hometown of Arshaluys and in nearby Vagharshapat where he resided, many of which were not registered in his name and for which he did not pay the majority of taxes.

In an interview with RFE/RL's Armenian service that same year, Grigoryan stated that he returned to Armenia with hundreds of Azerbaijani POWs after the Karabakh war, including one 15-year-old Azerbaijani child that he kept in his home for 4 years. Human rights activists like Larisa Alaverdyan who during the years of the war in Karabakh was engaged in the exchange of prisoners accused Grigoryan of breaching Geneva Conventions. Grigoryan responded that "during war nobody had time to read Geneva conventions."

Politics
During the protests following the disputed 2008 Armenian presidential election, there were expectations that Grigoryan and another deputy defense minister, Gagik Melkonyan, would encourage the army and the Yerkrapah Volunteer Union to intervene in favor of the protestors led by ex-president Levon Ter-Petrosyan. Ter-Petrosyan declared on 21 February 2008 that he had met with Grigoryan and Gagik Melkonyan and that they had agreed to join the protestors. The protests were suppressed using the army on 1 March 2008, resulting in the deaths of 10 people. Then president-elect Serzh Sargsyan stated on 13 March 2008 that he was "deeply regretful and hurt that he [Manvel Grigoryan] made an attempt to enter politics and disobey his commander-in-chief." On 2 April 2008, Grigoryan was dismissed from the post of deputy defense minister by President Robert Kocharyan. In an interview given in 2012, Grigoryan stated that although there were people who tried to involve the Yerkrapah Union in political processes during the 2008 protests, he worked to keep the Yerkrapah Union out of politics at the time.

On 6 May 2012, he was elected a deputy to the parliament from the Republican Party of Armenia. During his tenure, Grigoryan was a close ally of Sedrak Saroyan, and the pair were described as being like "Siamese twins".

Arrest 
Grigoryan was arrested in Armenia on 16 June 2018 by the National Security Service at his home in Vagharshapat. He was charged with the illegal possession of firearms and ammunition. Prime Minister Nikol Pashinyan also claimed that he stole aid intended for frontline soldiers sent by schoolchildren during the 2016 Nagorno-Karabakh clashes. In his house, the National Security Service also found many weapons and ammunition including, RPG-7s, a car collection which included vehicles and ambulance cars designated for the army. Additionally, a private zoo was discovered, on which premises investigators found used cans of meat products intended for military consumption. Grigoryan was standing trial at the Yerevan Court of General Jurisdiction on the charges of illegal possession and storage of weapons and ammunition, embezzlement of 101,232,917 AMD, evasion of 1,228,176,342 AMD taxes, misuse of 1,225,003,300 AMD state funds and the organization of misappropriation of 37,101,100 AMD worth of property accompanied by extortion. He was released on a bail of 25 million AMD on 21 December 2018, but was arrested again on 22 January 2019. He was released again on 15 January 2020 due to his deteriorating health, and signed an affidavit not to leave the country.

Death 
Grigoryan died on November 19, 2020 at the age of 64. Grigoryan had previously been in critical condition after being in Artsakh a week after the start of the Second Nagorno-Karabakh War, where he became infected with COVID-19. Former president Serzh Sargsyan sent a telegram of condolence to the Grigoryan family on his death. Citing the recently signed Nagorno-Karabakh ceasefire agreement, Sargsyan said that "The hero of Artsakh also passed away by seeing how the authorities handed over the lands he had actively helped liberate and the martyrdom of several heroic men for which all us Armenians are mourning" saying that it "dealt a great blow to Manvel". Grigoryan was not buried at Yerablur in Yerevan next to Vazgen Sargsyan, which was specified as his last wish, with his former assistant saying that the funeral will be held in his native Arshaluys.

Personal life 
He was married to Nazik Amiryan, with whom he had 8 children, including his son Karen Grigoryan, who is the former mayor of Vagharshapat. Over the years of his service, Grigoryan has gained the following national awards:

 Medal of “Military Cross” (1994)
 Medal of the “Golden Eagle” (2000)
 Hero of Artsakh (2000)
 Medal of "Vazgen Sargsyan” (2002)

References

External links 
 Manvel Grigoryan's "Hidden Assets"

1956 births
2020 deaths
Heroes of Artsakh
Armenian military personnel of the Nagorno-Karabakh War
Armenian generals
People from Armavir Province
Members of the National Assembly (Armenia)
Soviet Army personnel
Yerevan State University alumni
Artsakh University alumni